During the 2007–08 English football season, Luton Town competed in League One.

Season summary
After a poor start to the 2007–08 season, the club entered administration on 22 November 2007; Pinkney stated he would fund the club's overheads, while ten points were deducted. Meanwhile, the FA probe on transfer irregularities dragged on, described by Pinkney as "a storm in a teacup". Blackwell was sacked by the administrator on 15 January 2008, to be replaced by former player Mick Harford. The club subsequently entered the custody of the Luton Town Football Club 2020 consortium. Luton were relegated to League Two on 12 April, following a 2–1 home defeat to Brighton & Hove Albion; Luton finished the season in bottom place.

League table

Squad
Squad at end of season

Left club during season

Transfers

Out
 Russell Perrett
 Warren Feeney
 Michael Leary
 Adam Boyd
 Danny Stevens
 Shaun Ross
 Leon Barnett
 Markus Heikkinen
 Peter Holmes
 Chris Pendleton
 Kevin Foley – Wolverhampton Wanderers
 Ahmet Brković – Millwall
 Chris Coyne – Colchester United

See also
List of Luton Town F.C. seasons

References

Luton Town F.C. seasons
Luton Town F.C.